Enrique Pimentel Zúñiga (1574–1653) was a Roman Catholic prelate who served as Bishop of Cuenca (1623–1653) and Bishop of Valladolid (1619–1623).

Biography
Enrique Pimentel Zúñiga was born in Benavides de Orvigo, Spain on 5 Aug 1574 and ordained a priest on 29 Jul 1619 .
On 29 Jul 1619, he was appointed during the papacy of Pope Paul V as Bishop of Valladolid.
On 8 Dec 1619, he was consecrated bishop by Fernando Acevedo González, Archbishop of Burgos, with Juan Portocarrero, Bishop of Almería, serving as co-consecrator. 
On 13 Feb 1623, he was appointed during the papacy of Pope Gregory XV as Bishop of Cuenca.
He served as Bishop of Cuenca until his death on 11 Jun 1653.

Episcopal succession
While bishop, he was the principal consecrator of:
Garcerán Albañell, Archbishop of Granada (1621);
Juan de la Torre Ayala, Archbishop of Granada (1622);
Juan Pereda Gudiel, Bishop of Oviedo (1627); and
Domingo Pimentel Zúñiga, Bishop of Osma (1631).

See also
Catholic Church in Spain

References

External links and additional sources
 (for Chronology of Bishops) 
 (for Chronology of Bishops) 

17th-century Roman Catholic bishops in Spain
Bishops appointed by Pope Paul V
Bishops appointed by Pope Gregory XV
1574 births
1653 deaths